James M. Stayer (born 1935) is a historian specializing in the German Reformation, particularly the anabaptist movement. He is also a Professor Emeritus at Queen's University in Kingston, Ontario, Canada. Born in Lancaster County, Pennsylvania, Stayer received his PhD from Cornell University in 1964. After teaching at Ithaca College, Bridgewater College and Bucknell University, he moved to Canada in 1968 to teach at Queen's University. He became a Canadian citizen in 1977.

Bibliography
Anabaptists and the Sword (1972, 1976)
The Anabaptists and Thomas Müntzer (1980) (co-edited with Werner O. Packull)
The German Peasants' War and Anabaptist Community of Goods (1991, 1994)
Martin Luther, German saviour: German evangelical theological factions and the interpretation of Luther, 1917–1933 (2000)
Radikalität und Dissent im 16. Jahrhundert/Radicalism and Dissent in the Sixteenth Century (2002) (co-edited with Hans-Jürgen Goertz)
 "A Companion to Anabaptism and Spiritualism, 1521–1700" (2007) (co-edited with John D. Roth)

References

Living people
1935 births
People from Lancaster County, Pennsylvania
American emigrants to Canada
20th-century Canadian historians
Canadian male non-fiction writers
Reformation historians
Cornell University alumni
Academic staff of the Queen's University at Kingston
Bridgewater College alumni
Bridgewater College faculty
21st-century Canadian historians